Andrzej Komorowski (born 19 October 1975) is a Polish Catholic priest and the current Superior General of the Priestly Fraternity of Saint Peter. He was elected to a six-year term on 9 July 2018 by the General Chapter of the Fraternity at Our Lady of Guadalupe Seminary located in Denton, Nebraska.

Komorowski resides at the Fraternity's General House in Fribourg, Switzerland. He is the fourth Superior General of the Priestly Fraternity of Saint Peter and the first Pole to hold that position.

References

External links
Priestly Fraternity of St. Peter - international website with pages in English, French, German, Spanish, Portuguese, Italian, Polish, and Latin

1975 births
Living people
People from Łomża
Priestly Fraternity of St. Peter
Thomas Aquinas College alumni
21st-century Polish Roman Catholic priests
Polish traditionalist Catholics
Traditionalist Catholic priests